Marcus Milner may refer to:

 Marcus Milner (footballer) (born 1991), Jamaican footballer
 Marcus Milner (cricketer) (1864–1939), English racehorse trainer, soldier and cricketer